Alexandru Busuioceanu (January 1896 in Slatina – March 13, 1961, Madrid) was a Romanian essayist, poet, historian and diplomat.

As a historian, Busuioceanu wrote studies about Zamolxis, the god of the ancient Dacians. He also wrote art books on the paintings in the collection of the Romanian Royal Family and on the watercolour paintings of Amedeo Preziosi.

He died in Madrid in mysterious circumstances.

Works

 Une miniature inédite du XIIIe siècle reproduisant une oeuvre de Pietro Cavallini, 1928
 Iser, 1930
 Daniele da Volterra e la storia di un motivo pittorico, 1932.
 Intorno a Franco-Bolognese. 1934
 Les Tableaux au Greco dans la collection royale de Roumanie 1934
 Preziosi, 1935
 Domenico Theotocopuli El Greco. Exposition organisée par la Gazette des Beaux-arts. - 1937
 Poemas pateticos, 1948
 La Peinture espagnole: 2. De Velasquez à Picasso. Texte de Jacques Lassaigne. Biographies et bibliographie - 1952
 Proporción de vivir - poemas, 1954)
 Georges Cioranescu. Un poète roumain en Espagne - 1962)

References

 Braşovul Tău  - Paştele Romano-Catolic 2008 

Romanian male poets
Romanian diplomats
1896 births
1961 deaths
20th-century Romanian poets
20th-century Romanian male writers